Ulrich Hosius (c. 1455–1535 in Vilnius) was a noble of German descent from the Grand Duchy of Lithuania.

Born in Pforzheim, he lived most of his life in the Grand Duchy of Lithuania and at the court of Lithuanian rulers. In the early 16th century, he was made a high-ranking official at the Kraków mint (1503). He then he moved to Kaunas in 1504, where he became a prominent and influential citizen. Later Hosius relocated to Vilnius where he headed the newly opened Lithuanian Mint and took the offices of mayor (Castellan) of Vilnius between 1524 and 1535 and flag-bearer of Vilnius Castle during 1528–1535.

From 1513, Hosius was appointed as a supervisor (aedilis) at the reconstruction of the Lower Castle by the Grand Duke of Lithuania Sigismund I the Old and as a supervisor of the reconstruction of the Royal palace. From 1515 Hosius supervised the building of mills in the Grand Duchy. He is remembered as the builder of the Green Bridge (1532–1534), one of the first permanent bridges across the Neris River and the first recorded owner of the village of Bezdonys (since 1516). Hosius started the construction of St. Theresa Church in Vilnius. Simultaneously Hosius started the construction works on The Holy Trinity asylum, which was finished by his son, Stanislaus Hosius in 1570, who rose to the ranks of a Catholic bishop, cardinal and Papal legate. Hosius supervised the construction of the first water-supply system of Vilnius.

References

 
 

1455 births
1535 deaths
15th-century Lithuanian nobility
16th-century Lithuanian nobility
15th-century Polish nobility
16th-century Polish nobility
Lithuanian people of German descent
Mayors of Vilnius
People from Pforzheim
Polish people of German descent